Matti Heikkinen (born 19 December 1983 in Kajaani) is a Finnish former cross-country skier and World Champion who competed from 2002 to 2019.

Career
Heikkinen won his first World Championship at the FIS Nordic World Ski Championships 2011 in Holmenkollen 2011. Winning 15 km, he is the first Finnish men's World Champion for over a decade. He also won two bronze medals at the FIS Nordic World Ski Championships 2009 in Liberec, earning them in the 15 km and 4 × 10 km relay events.

In December 2009, Heikkinen took his first World Cup victory on the 15 km freestyle event in Davos.

Heikkinen finished fifth in the 4 × 10 km relay at the 2010 Winter Olympics in Vancouver, Canada.

He announced his retirement from cross-country skiing in March 2019.

Heikkinen lives in Jyväskylä and studies at the University of Jyväskylä School of Business.

Cross-country skiing results
All results are sourced from the International Ski Federation (FIS).

Olympic Games

World Championships
 4 medals – (1 gold, 3 bronze)

World Cup

Season standings

Individual podiums
4 victories – (1 , 3 ) 
15 podiums – (5 , 10 )

References

External links
 
 
 

1983 births
Living people
People from Kajaani
Finnish male cross-country skiers
Olympic cross-country skiers of Finland
Cross-country skiers at the 2010 Winter Olympics
Cross-country skiers at the 2014 Winter Olympics
Cross-country skiers at the 2018 Winter Olympics
Tour de Ski skiers
FIS Nordic World Ski Championships medalists in cross-country skiing
Sportspeople from Kainuu
21st-century Finnish people